The 1998 NCAA Division I Field Hockey Championship was the 18th women's collegiate field hockey tournament organized by the National Collegiate Athletic Association to determine the top college field hockey team in the United States. The Old Dominion won their third championship, defeating the Princeton Tigers in the final. The championship rounds were held at the Franklin Field in Philadelphia, Pennsylvania on the campus of the University of Pennsylvania. It was the final tournament with a twelve-team field before expanding to sixteen teams the following year.

Bracket

References 

1998
Field Hockey
1998 in women's field hockey
1998 in sports in Pennsylvania